Javier Cortina Lacerra (born 12 April 1987, in Santiago de Cuba) is a Cuban freestyle wrestler. He competed in the freestyle 96 kg event at the 2012 Summer Olympics and was eliminated by Khetag Pliev in the 1/8 finals. He was a bronze medalist at the 2014 World Wrestling Championships after Şamil Erdoğan of Turkey drug test positive, Javier Cortina was raised to third and took the bronze medal.

References

External links
 

1987 births
Living people
Cuban male sport wrestlers
Olympic wrestlers of Cuba
Wrestlers at the 2012 Summer Olympics
Wrestlers at the 2016 Summer Olympics
Sportspeople from Santiago de Cuba
Wrestlers at the 2015 Pan American Games
World Wrestling Championships medalists
Pan American Games competitors for Cuba